Hornberger may refer to :

 Gerd Hornberger (1910–1988), Olympic German athlete who competed in the 1936 Summer Olympics.
 Hans Hornberger (1907-1944), a German resistance against Nazis.
 H. Richard Hornberger (1924-1997), American writer and surgeon.
 Pete Hornberger, a fictional character played by Scott Adsit on the American television series 30 Rock.
 Raymond Hornberger (1898–1976), American soccer halfback.
 Jacob Hornberger (1950–), American politician and 2020 Libertarian presidential candidate.

See also 
 Hornberg (disambiguation)

German-language surnames